Mahila Maha Vidyalaya (MMV), also known as Women's College, Banaras Hindu University, is a women's college in the Banaras Hindu University, Varanasi, India which offers undergraduate, postgraduate and doctoral courses in various subjects to women. It was founded in 1929 by Mahamana Pandit Madan Mohan Malaviya.

See also
 Banaras Hindu University
 List of educational institutions in Varanasi

References

External links
 

Women's universities and colleges in Uttar Pradesh
Universities and colleges in Varanasi
Banaras Hindu University
Educational institutions established in 1929
1929 establishments in India
Madan Mohan Malaviya